

no

nob-nom
noberastine (INN)
nocloprost (INN)
nocodazole (INN)
nofecainide (INN)
nogalamycin (INN)
Nogenic HC
nolatrexed (INN)
nolinium bromide (INN)
nolpitantium besilate (INN)
Noludar
Nolvadex (AstraZeneca)
nomegestrol (INN)
nomelidine (INN)
nomifensine (INN)

non
nonabine (INN)
nonacog alfa (INN)
nonaperone (INN)
nonapyrimine (INN)
nonathymulin (INN)
nonivamide (INN)
nonoxinol (INN)

nor
Nor-QD

nora-nore
noracymethadol (INN)
norboletone (INN)
norbudrine (INN)
Norcept-E
Norcet
norclostebol (INN)
Norco
norcodeine (INN)
Norcuron
nordazepam (INN)
Nordette
nordinone (INN)
Norditropin
norepinephrine (INN)
norethandrolone (INN)
Norethin
norethisterone (INN)
noretynodrel (INN)
noreximide (INN)

norf-norl
norfenefrine (INN)
Norflex
Norflohexal (Hexal Australia) [Au]. Redirects to norfloxacin.
norfloxacin succinil (INN)
norfloxacin (INN)
Norgesic
norgesterone (INN)
norgestimate (INN)
norgestomet (INN)
norgestrel (INN)
norgestrienone (INN)
Norinyl
Norisodrine
Noritate
Norlestrin
norletimol (INN)
norleusactide (INN)
norlevorphanol (INN)
Norlutate
Norlutin

norm-norv
normethadone (INN)
Normiflo
Normodyne
normorphine (INN)
Normosol
Normozide
Noroxin
Norpace
norpipanone (INN)
Norplant
Norpramin
Norquest Fe
nortetrazepam (INN)
Nortrel
nortriptyline (INN)
Norvasc
norvinisterone (INN)
Norvir

nos-nox
nosantine (INN)
noscapine (INN)
nosiheptide (INN)
Novafed
Novamine
Novantrone
Novantrone (Immunex Corporation)
Novantrone (Lederle Laboratories)
Novasone
novobiocin (INN)
Novocain (Hospira)
Novolin 70/30 (Novo Nordisk)
Novolin N (Novo Nordisk)
Novolin R (Novo Nordisk)
Novolog (Novo Nordisk)
Novothyrox
Novrad
noxiptiline (INN)
noxytiolin (INN)

np-ny
NPH Iletin
NPH insulin
Nubain
nuclomedone (INN)
nuclotixene (INN)
nufenoxole (INN)
Nulytely
Numax
Numorphan
nupafant (INN)
Nuprin
Nurofen
Nuromax
Nutracort
Nutrestore
Nutrilipid
Nutropin
Nuvaring
nuvenzepine (INN)
Nuvion
Nydrazid
Nysert
Nystaform
nystatin (INN)
Nystex
Nystop